Plasmodium giganteum is a parasite of the genus Plasmodium subgenus Sauramoeba. As in all Plasmodium species, P. giganteum has both vertebrate and insect hosts. The vertebrate hosts for this parasite are reptiles.

Taxonomy 
The parasite was first described by Theiler in 1930.

Description 
P. giganteum blood-stage parasites are described as being 2 to 6 times as large as the host cell nucleus. The gametocytes are round and elongated.

Distribution 
P. giganteum has only been described in Gbanga, Liberia.

Hosts 
P. giganteum infects the rainbow lizard (Agama agama), as well as Agama mossambica and Agama cyanogaster.

References

Further reading 

giganteum